"Beautiful Disaster" is a song recorded by the band 311 and released in 1997. It is the third and final single from the album Transistor.

Reception
Consequence of Sound commented that "Beautiful Disaster" may be 311's greatest hit and states that it has one of the most recognizable intros in any song.

Music video

The music video features clips of 311 live and with a wild crowd.

In other media
The song is a playable track in the video game Guitar Hero World Tour.
The song was used by the professional wrestling tag team of the Motor City Machine Guns in Ring of Honor and CHIKARA Pro.
The song was used in the video game MLB 11: The Show.
The song is downloadable for the video game Rock Band 3.
This song was used in the Daria season two episode, "The Daria Hunter" as the Lawndale High School students are entering the paintball field.
This song was used in the Orange is the New Black season three episode, "A Tittin' and a Hairin'" during a flashback conversation between "Pennsatucky" and her boyfriend outside of a house party. The track can be heard playing in the background.
The song is downloadable for the video game Rocksmith.

Charts

References 

1997 singles
311 (band) songs
Songs written by Nick Hexum
1996 songs
Capricorn Records singles